Keith Martin may refer to:
 Keith Martin (politician) (born 1960), Canadian executive director of the Consortium of Universities for Global Health, former politician
 Keith Martin (ophthalmologist) (born 20th-century), medical researcher specialising in the treatment of glaucoma
 Keith Martin (broadcaster) (born 1934), British broadcaster and pirate radio DJ 
 Keith Martin (musician) (1966–2022), American R&B singer-songwriter and multi-instrumentalist
 Keith Martin (Time Crisis), a character in Time Crisis II
 Carl Sargent or Keith Martin (born 1952), British parapsychologist and author of several roleplaying game-based products and novels
 Keith Martin, founder and editor of Sports Car Market

See also
 Keith Martyn (fl. 1990s–2000s), Australian weather presenter